SS Iowan was a cargo ship built in 1914 for the American-Hawaiian Steamship Company. During World War I she was taken over by the United States Navy and commissioned as USS Iowan (ID-3002). During World War II, the ship was transferred to the Soviet Union and renamed SS Tashkent (or Ташкент in Cyrillic).

Iowan was built by the Maryland Steel Company as one of eight sister ships for the American-Hawaiian Steamship Company. In October 1914, five months after she was delivered to American-Hawaiian, Iowan rammed and sank the United Fruit Company steamer Metapan near the entrance to New York Harbor. After repairs, Iowan resumed inter-coastal service via the Panama Canal. When the canal was temporarily closed by landslides in late 1915, Iowan sailed via the Straits of Magellan until the canal reopened in mid 1916. During World War I, USS Iowan carried cargo, animals, and a limited number of passengers to France, and returned nearly 10,000 American troops after the Armistice.

After her Navy service ended in 1919, she was returned to her original owners, who, at least once, chartered her to another shipping company. In May 1922, Iowan rammed and sank the Furness-Prince Line steamer Welsh Prince in the Columbia River near Astoria, Oregon, killing seven men in the process. In June 1941, Iowan ran aground on a reef near Point Conception, California, and suffered $500,000 in damages while buffeted by waves on the reef. She was freed from the reef after two weeks, towed to Los Angeles, and repaired.

In 1942, the ship was requisitioned by the War Shipping Administration, which transferred her to the Soviet Union under the terms of Lend-Lease in December 1942. She was assigned to the Far East Shipping Company under her new name of SS Tashkent, but sailed with the Soviet Pacific Fleet throughout the war. She delivered cargo and troops in support of the Soviet invasion of Japanese-held territories in August 1945. After the war, the ship remained a part of the Soviet merchant fleet until 1966. She was transferred to North Korea at that time to become a fish processing facility, and was scrapped in 1969.

Design and construction
The contract cost of the ships was set at the construction cost plus an 8% profit for Maryland Steel, but with a maximum cost of $640,000 per ship. The construction was financed by Maryland Steel with a credit plan that called for a 5% down payment in cash with nine monthly installments for the balance. Provisions of the deal allowed that some of the nine installments could be converted into longer-term notes or mortgages. The final cost of Iowan, including financing costs, was $71.95 per deadweight ton, which came out to just over $732,000.

Iowan (Maryland Steel yard no. 132) was the first ship built under the contract. She was launched on 24 January 1914, and delivered to American-Hawaiian on 16 May.

Early career
When Iowan began sailing for American-Hawaiian, the company shipped cargo from East Coast ports via the Straits of Magellan to West Coast ports and Hawaii, and vice versa. Eastbound shipments were primarily sugar and pineapple from Hawaii, while westbound cargoes were more general in nature. With the opening of the Panama Canal on 15 August 1914, American-Hawaiian ships switched to taking that route.

At 15:20 on 15 October 1914, the outbound Iowan rammed the United Fruit Company passenger and cargo steamer Metapan at the entrance of Ambrose Channel outside New York. Metapan had stopped in the dense fog, but Iowan was traveling at a rapid pace. Iowans captain did not alter the ship's course, but did drop her anchor to try to slow the fully laden ship. Nevertheless, Iowan gashed the bow of Metapan and traveled almost halfway through the passenger ship. When Iowan pulled out three minutes later, Metapan began to sink rapidly. A variety of craft—including the nearby British Royal Navy cruiser —responded to Metapans SOS. Even though the ship was resting on the bottom and the passengers in no immediate danger, most of the 78 passengers and 90 crewmen evacuated the ship in lifeboats and were picked up by rescue craft. Iowan, which suffered no casualties among her crew, attempted to return to her pier in Brooklyn, but was unable and instead anchored in Ambrose Channel. Iowans damage was restricted to her bow, which was crushed above the waterline. Two days later, The Wall Street Journal reported that Iowan was anchored off Clifton, Staten Island, and awaiting inspection from surveyors.

After repairs and return to service, Iowan resumed her inter-coastal service. In mid-September the same year, Iowan sailed from Boston for the West Coast. Initially, American-Hawaiian had Iowan wait in case the canal would soon reopen, but when it became apparent that the closure would last some time, perhaps as long as ten months, Iowan was sent around South America to her destinations, Los Angeles and San Francisco. The Los Angeles Times reported that one portion of Iowans delayed cargo consisted of Christmas toys for Los Angeles merchants. The newspaper went on to predict that the delay would be "very disastrous" for the holiday season.

The balance of Iowans activities over the next two years are unclear. She may have been in the half of the American-Hawaiian fleet that was chartered for transatlantic service. She may also have been in the group of American-Hawaiian ships chartered for service to South America, delivering coal, gasoline, and steel in exchange for coffee, nitrates, cocoa, rubber, and manganese ore.

World War I
On 23 December 1917, some seven months after the United States declared war on Germany, the United States Navy acquired Iowan from American-Hawaiian. USS Iowan was commissioned the same day.

Iowan loaded a cargo of 800 horses, along with flour, iron, and machinery at Newport News, Virginia and sailed for New York on 9 February 1918. There she joined a convoy that sailed for France on 11 February and arrived at its destination on 28 February; Iowan discharged her equine passengers—less seven that died or were destroyed during the voyage—at Remount Depot No. 3 on 5 March. Iowan continued carrying livestock and food products to France through the rest of the war. On 9 November, Iowan took on 72 officers and men, and headed for France with cargo ship  two days before the Armistice.

With the fighting at an end, the task of bringing home American soldiers began almost immediately. Iowan was selected for conversion to a troop transport and transferred to the Cruiser and Transport Force, but before she could begin returning troops, Iowan had to undergo conversion from a cargo and animal ship. Though sources do not indicate the specific modifications Iowan underwent, typical conversions for other ships included the installation of berths for troops, and adding greatly expanded cooking and toilet facilities to handle the large numbers of men aboard. Similar modifications on Iowans sister ship  took three months, but it is not known how long Iowans refit took. By the time Iowan had completed her sixth and final trooping voyage on 29 August 1919, Iowan had carried home 9,876 healthy and wounded men. USS Iowan was decommissioned on 22 September 1919, and returned to American-Hawaiian.

Interwar years
Iowan resumed cargo service with American-Hawaiian after her return from World War I service. Though the company had abandoned its original Hawaiian sugar routes by this time, Iowan continued inter-coastal service through the Panama Canal.	For a time in the early 1920s, Iowan was chartered to the United American Line. In May 1922, the Associated Press reported that Iowan, sailing under the United American banner, was loading wheat, flour, and lumber at Tacoma, Washington, for England and European ports. Later that same month, on 29 May, Iowan rammed and sank the Furness-Prince Line cargo ship Welsh Prince in the Columbia River near Astoria, Oregon. Seven men aboard Welsh Prince were killed and three were injured in the crash and subsequent fire.

At 04:20 on 12 June, Iowan ran aground on a reef a few hundred yards (meters) off shore from Government Point,— northwest of Los Angeles,—near Point Conception. Salvage operations took some two weeks, but the ship was towed back to Los Angeles and placed in drydock at the Bethlehem Shipyard on Terminal Island. Approximately  of the ship's hull had been damaged while the ship was buffeted by waves on the reef, which had opened numerous holes in her hull. The ship's drive shaft had broken, and her boilers and engines had shifted. The Los Angeles Times reported that estimates for Iowans repair ranged up to $500,000. In an inquiry held by the Bureau of Marine Inspection and Navigation, Iowans captain, S. A. Gates, a Californian with 25 years of sailing experience along the coast, blamed unusual tides for the grounding.

World War II and later career

In 1942, after Iowan was repaired and after the United States had entered World War II, the ship was requisitioned by the War Shipping Administration (WSA). On 6 December 1942, Iowan was transferred to the Soviet Union under Lend-Lease, and renamed Tashkent (Ташкент ) after the capital of Uzbekistan. Near the end of World War II, the WSA offered a payment of $694,743 to American-Hawaiian for the former Iowan as part of a $7.2 million settlement for eleven American-Hawaiian ships that had been requisitioned by the WSA.

Tashkent was assigned to the Far East Shipping Company (FESCO), but sailed with the Pacific Fleet of the Soviet Navy throughout the war. Tashkent was photographed at San Francisco at some point during the war, but most of her other movements are not known. However, in August 1945, Tashkent delivered troops and cargo in support of the Soviet invasions of Japanese-held Manchuria, Korea, Sakhalin, and the Kurile Islands. After the war's end, Tashkent returned to merchant operation with FESCO through 1966, when she was transferred to North Korea for use as a fish processing facility. The former Tashkent was scrapped in 1969.

Notes

References

Bibliography

External links
 

Ships built in Sparrows Point, Maryland
Cargo ships
World War I merchant ships of the United States
World War II merchant ships of the United States
Merchant ships of the Soviet Union
World War II merchant ships of the Soviet Union
Soviet Union–United States relations
1914 ships
World War I cargo ships of the United States
Cargo ships of the United States Navy
Maritime incidents in June 1941